The Royal Saint Vincent and the Grenadines Police Force (RSVGPF), is the national police force of Saint Vincent and the Grenadines, it was founded in 1999. The Commissioner of Police is Colin John, who commands 691 police officers and civilian employees, in 23 police stations, who serve a resident population of 109,000.

The RSVGPF maintain two paramilitary forces: the Special Service Unit and the Coast Guard; both are responsible for internal security. Defence is the responsibility of the Regional Security System. There is also one non-policing organisation under the command of the RSVGPF Fire Brigade, which is currently directed by Inspector Joel James.

See also
Saint Vincent and the Grenadines
Military of Saint Vincent and the Grenadines
List of countries without armed forces

References

External links
Official Website

 
Politics of Saint Vincent and the Grenadines
Law of Saint Vincent and the Grenadines